German submarine U-535 was a Type IXC/40 U-boat of Nazi Germany's Kriegsmarine during World War II. The submarine was laid down on 6 March 1942 at the Deutsche Werft yard at Hamburg, launched on 8 October 1942, and commissioned on 23 December 1942 under the command of Kapitänleutnant Helmut Ellmenreich. After training with 4th U-boat Flotilla in the Baltic Sea, U-535 was transferred to 10th U-boat Flotilla for front-line service. U-535 completed one patrol, but did not sink any ships.

Design
German Type IXC/40 submarines were slightly larger than the original Type IXCs. U-535 had a displacement of  when at the surface and  while submerged. She had two shafts and two  propellers.

U-535 was fitted with six  torpedo tubes (four fitted at the bow and two at the stern), 22 torpedoes, one  SK C/32 naval gun, 180 rounds, and a  SK C/30 as well as a  C/30 anti-aircraft gun. The boat had a complement of forty-eight.

Service history

U-535 sailed from Kiel on 25 May 1943 on her first and only war patrol in the north Atlantic.

On 8 June at about 14:00, the U-boat was attacked with depth charges by a Hudson light bomber from No. 269 Squadron RAF, close to Convoy SC 132. A follow-up attack by another Hudson from the same squadron was aborted when the depth charges failed to release in two attack runs. The aircraft was damaged by the U-boat's flak, and the pilot warned an arriving United States Navy Catalina patrol bomber of Squadron VP-84 that the boat would stay up and fight, so the flying boat shadowed U-535 until it escaped at dusk.

Sinking
The U-boats evaded the first attack, and U-536 was strafed in the second. U-536 gave the signal to crash-dive, but for unknown reasons U-535 remained on the surface. Despite hitting the aircraft with her AA guns, the U-boat was straddled by eight depth charges and sank with all hands in position . Damaged and with one crewman wounded, the aircraft immediately left the area and returned to base.

References

Bibliography

External links

German Type IX submarines
U-boats commissioned in 1942
U-boats sunk in 1943
U-boats sunk by depth charges
U-boats sunk by British aircraft
World War II submarines of Germany
World War II shipwrecks in the Atlantic Ocean
1942 ships
Ships built in Hamburg
Ships lost with all hands
Maritime incidents in July 1943